John Spicer (died 26 December 1623), of Pease Lane, Dorchester, Dorset, was an English politician and tailor.

Family
He married Thomasine Read and they had two sons, including Walter Spicer.

Career
He was a Member (MP) of the Parliament of England for Dorchester in 1604.

References

16th-century births
1623 deaths
Members of the Parliament of England for Dorchester
English MPs 1604–1611